Lee Won-geun (born June 27, 1991) is a South Korean actor. He made his acting debut in the 2012 popular historical television drama Moon Embracing the Sun (2012) and is best known for starring in the high school drama Cheer Up! (2015) and One the Woman (2021), as well as the film Misbehavior (2017).

Personal life 
Lee  mandatory military service on June 13, 2019 in the National Police Agency Compulsory Police Sugyeong Military Service and was discharged from the conscripted police on January 7, 2021.

Filmography

Film

Television series

Web series

Television shows

Music video

Awards and nominations

References

External links

1991 births
Living people
South Korean male television actors
South Korean male film actors
South Korean male models
Konkuk University alumni
21st-century South Korean male actors